"Let's Get Away" is a song by American hip hop recording artist T.I., released as the fourth and final single from his second studio album, Trap Muzik (2003). The song features vocals and production from American musician Jazze Pha. It peaked at number 35 on the US Billboard Hot 100 chart. The song interpolates Aretha Franklin's 1972 song "Day Dreaming".

Music video
The music video was directed by Darren Grant, while T.I. was sentenced to three years in prison. He was granted rights to film the video for "Let's Get Away" while in prison. Fellow American rappers, Trina and Juvenile, make cameo appearances throughout the video.

Track listing

A-side
1. "Let's Get Away [Edited]" 
2. "Let's Get Away [Explicit]" 
3. "Let's Get Away [Instrumental]"

B-side
1. "Doin' My Job [Edited]" 
2. "Doin' My Job [Explicit]" 
3. "Doin' My Job [Instrumental]"

Charts

Release history

References

External links
 

2003 singles
Grand Hustle Records singles
T.I. songs
Songs written by Aretha Franklin
Songs written by T.I.
Atlantic Records singles
Music videos directed by Darren Grant
Dirty rap songs